Louisa County is a county located in the U.S. state of Iowa. As of the 2020 census, the population was 10,837. The county seat is Wapello.

Louisa County is part of the Muscatine Micropolitan Statistical Area.

History
Louisa County was formed on December 7, 1836, as a part of Wisconsin Territory. Two theories have been offered for the origins of its name: one is that it was named after Louisa Massey, who was very well known in the area at the time because she avenged the murder of her brother when she shot the party responsible; the other is that it was named after Louisa County, Virginia. Louisa County became a part of Iowa Territory upon its formation on July 4, 1838. Zach Odle and Zach Grimm both hail from Wapello.

The first courthouse was a simple wood-framed building.  In 1840, a second courthouse, measuring 40' x 20' (about 12 x 6 m), was constructed of stone.  In 1854, a third structure was built.  The courthouse used today was erected in 1928.

Geography
Its eastern border is adjacent to the Mississippi River.

Major highways
 U.S. Highway 61
 Iowa Highway 70
 Iowa Highway 78
 Iowa Highway 92

Adjacent counties
Johnson County  (northwest)
Muscatine County  (north)
Rock Island County, Illinois  (northeast)
Mercer County, Illinois  (east)
Des Moines County  (south)
Henry County  (southwest)
Washington County  (west)

National protected area
 Port Louisa National Wildlife Refuge

Demographics

2020 census
There were 4,712 housing units, of which 4,180 were occupied.

2010 census
There were 5,002 housing units, of which 4,346 were occupied.

2000 census

As of the census of 2000, there were 12,183 people, 4,519 households, and 3,316 families residing in the county. There were 5,133 housing units at an average density of 13 per square mile (5/km2). The racial makeup of the county was 93.91% White, 0.25% Black or African American, 0.18% Native American, 0.20% Asian, 0.02% Pacific Islander, 4.56% from other races, and 0.88% from two or more races.  12.62% of the population were Hispanic or Latino of any race.

There were 4,519 households, out of which 35.00% had children under the age of 18 living with them, 61.30% were married couples living together, 8.20% had a female householder with no husband present, and 26.60% were non-families. 22.50% of all households were made up of individuals, and 10.40% had someone living alone who was 65 years of age or older.  The average household size was 2.66 and the average family size was 3.11.

In the county, the population was spread out, with 27.70% under the age of 18, 7.90% from 18 to 24, 28.70% from 25 to 44, 21.70% from 45 to 64, and 14.10% who were 65 years of age or older.  The median age was 36 years. For every 100 females, there were 98.90 males.  For every 100 females age 18 and over, there were 96.00 males.

The median income for a household in the county was $39,086, and the median income for a family was $43,972. Males had a median income of $31,293 versus $22,085 for females. The per capita income for the county was $17,644.  About 7.00% of families and 9.30% of the population were below the poverty line, including 12.40% of those under age 18 and 7.90% of those age 65 or over.

Communities

Cities

Columbus City
Columbus Junction
Cotter
Fredonia
Grandview
Letts
Morning Sun
Oakville
Wapello

Unincorporated community
Toolesboro

Townships

Columbus City
Concord
Eliot
Elm Grove
Grandview
Jefferson
Marshall
Morning Sun
Oakland
Port Louisa
Union
Wapello

Population ranking
The population ranking of the following table is based on the 2010 census of Louisa County.

† county seat

Politics

See also

National Register of Historic Places listings in Louisa County, Iowa

References

External links

Louisa County 

 
1836 establishments in Wisconsin Territory
Populated places established in 1836
Muscatine, Iowa micropolitan area
Iowa counties on the Mississippi River